Vingrau is a commune in the Pyrénées-Orientales department in southern France.

Geography 
Vingrau is located in the canton of La Vallée de l'Agly and in the arrondissement of Perpignan.

History 
The townhall of Vingrau was destroyed by a fire in 1935, with all the municipal archives, and causing the death of a local roadman.

Population

See also
Communes of the Pyrénées-Orientales department

References

Communes of Pyrénées-Orientales